Jeffrey Karl Ochsner (born 1950) is an architect, architectural historian, and professor at the University of Washington in Seattle.  He is known for his research and writing on American architects Henry Hobson Richardson and Lionel H. Pries, and on Seattle architecture;  he has also published articles that link architecture and psychoanalysis.

Career

Ochsner graduated from Rice University with a B.A. in Architecture in 1973 and a Master of Architecture (M.Arch.) in 1976.  He worked for Gunnar Birkerts and Associates in Michigan in 1973-74.  He was owner/principal of a Houston-based architectural practice, Ochsner Associates, from 1984 to 1987.  The firm was responsible for the architecture of the Galveston Island Trolley.

Ochsner has taught at the University of Washington since 1988.  He was Chair of the Department of Architecture from 1996 to 2002.  He served as Associate Dean in the College of Built Environments (CBE) from 2007 to 2019, and as CBE Advisor on Policy & Procedure from 2019 to 2020.  

Ochsner is a Fellow in the American Institute of Architects.  His co-authored book, Distant Corner: Seattle Architects and the Legacy of H. H. Richardson, was selected as one of "100 Top Books by 100 UW Authors" by Columns: University of Washington Alumni Magazine in December 2006.  His book, Lionel H. Pries, Architect, Artist, Educator: From Arts and Crafts to Modern Architecture, was a Finalist for the Washington State Book Award in History/Biography in 2008.   Publication of  Distant Corner and Lionel H. Pries was supported by grants from the Graham Foundation for Advanced Studies in the Fine Arts.  The Second Edition of Shaping Seattle Architecture:  A Historical Guide to the Architects received the Heritage Publication Award from Historic Seattle in May 2015.   Ochsner's articles have appeared in Journal of the Society of Architectural Historians, JAE: Journal of Architectural Education, Buildings & Landscapes, Pacific Northwest Quarterly, American Imago, and other journals.  Ochsner is included in the 2007 book The Things They've Done by William T. Cannady.

Ochsner is married to Sandra Lynn Perkins, a trusts and estates attorney.

Ochsner was diagnosed with a choroidal melanoma in 1997; radiation treatment was successful.

The Association of Collegiate Schools of Architecture selected Ochsner as one of five recipients of the 2012 ACSA Distinguished Professor Award.

Writings and presentations

Books

 Ochsner, Jeffrey Karl, editor/co-author, Shaping Seattle Architecture: A Historical Guide to the Architects Second Edition, University of Washington Press, Seattle and London 2014, .  First Edition:  AIA Seattle and University of Washington Press, Seattle and London 1994, 
 Ochsner, Jeffrey Karl, Furniture Studio: Materials, Craft, and Architecture University of Washington Press, Seattle and London, 2012.     
 Ochsner, Jeffrey Karl, Lionel H. Pries, Architect, Artist, Educator: From Arts and Crafts to Modern Architecture University of Washington Press, Seattle and London, 2007.     
 Ochsner, Jeffrey Karl, and Andersen, Dennis Alan, Distant Corner: Seattle Architects and the Legacy of H. H. Richardson, University of Washington Press, Seattle and London 2003, 
 Ochsner, Jeffrey Karl, H. H. Richardson: Complete Architectural Works, MIT Press, Cambridge MA and London, 1982,

Selected essays

 Ochsner, Jeffrey Karl, "The Experience of Prospect and Refuge: Frank Lloyd Wright's Houses as Holding Environments," American Imago 75 (Summer 2018), pp. 179–211.
 Ochsner, Jeffrey Karl, "Meditations on the Empty Chair: The Form of Mourning and Reverie," American Imago 73 (Summer 2016), pp. 131–163.
 Ochsner, Jeffrey Karl, "The Staten Island September 11 Memorial: Creativity, Mourning and the Experience of Loss," in Grief and Its Transcendence: Memory, Identity, Creativity, eds. Adele Tutter and Léon Wurmser, Routledge, London, 2015, pp. 30–47.
 Ochsner, Jeffrey Karl, "Behind the Mask: A Psychoanalytic Perspective on Design Studio," JAE: Journal of Architectural Education 53 (May 2000), pp. 194–206.
 Ochsner, Jeffrey Karl, "A Space of Loss: The Vietnam Veterans Memorial," JAE: Journal of Architectural Education 50 (February 1997), pp. 156–171.
 Ochsner, Jeffrey Karl, "Understanding the Holocaust through the United States Holocaust Memorial Museum" JAE: Journal of Architectural Education 48 (May 1995), pp. 240–249.

Videos

 "Town Square: Seattle's Greatest Architects," interview with Feliks Banel at Town Hall, Seattle, September 29, 2014
 "Back to the Future: Architecture at UW -- The First Fifty Years, 1914-1964," Jeffrey Karl Ochsner, Department of Architecture 100th Anniversary Lecture Series, May 6, 2015

References

External links
 AIA Seattle Fellows
  University of Washington Department of Architecture (people)

1950 births
American architectural historians
American architecture writers
American biographers
American male non-fiction writers
Fellows of the American Institute of Architects
Living people
Architects from Seattle
Rice University alumni
University of Washington faculty
Writers from Seattle